Katherina Matousek (born as Kateřina Matoušková; April 20, 1964) is a former pair skater who competed for Canada. Early in her career, she competed with Eric Thomsen. She joined forces with partner Lloyd Eisler in 1982. In 1984, they won the gold medal at the Canadian Championships and competed in the Olympics, finishing eighth. The next year they won the bronze medal at the 1985 World Championships.

Results

With Lloyd Eisler

With Eric Thomsen

References

1964 births
Living people
Canadian female pair skaters
Figure skaters at the 1984 Winter Olympics
Olympic figure skaters of Canada
Canadian people of Czech descent
Figure skaters from Prague
World Figure Skating Championships medalists